The key political players in Chhattisgarh state in central India are the ruling Bharatiya Janata Party, Indian National Congress, Janta Congress Chhattisgarh and Bahujan Samaj Party.

National politics
There are 11 Lok Sabha (lower house of the Indian Parliament) constituencies in Chhattisgarh.

State politics
The Chhattisgarh Legislative Assembly has 91 seats out of which 90 are directly elected from single-seat constituencies and 1 is nominated.

See also
 Chhattisgarh Legislative Assembly

References